Rob Frazier (born October 31, 1953) is an American Christian artist, musician, songwriter, record producer, and speaker.

Frazier is the son of a pastor, W. Burwell Frazier, founder of Warrington Fellowship Church. He was raised in Warminster, Bucks County, near Philadelphia, Pennsylvania and studied in King's College, New York City, majoring in English Literature. Later, he took an M.Div. from Regent University.

Over the years, Frazier has collaborated with numerous artists in and outside the contemporary Christian music scene, including co-writing the 1982 Kansas hit "Play the Game Tonight".

In 1978, he joined the Christian rock group Petra, where he played the keyboards and guitar while trading lead vocal duties with Greg X. Volz on the album Washes Whiter Than.

After Petra, Frazier embarked in a solo career releasing several albums, as well as frequently collaborating with Steve Camp. He wrote and performed numerous top 10 Christian songs including "Cut it Away", "Train Up a Child", "He Is All You Need" (later recorded by co-writer Steve Camp), "(Doesn't Anybody Pray in) This Town", "Break My Heart", "Got Your Word On It", "Go Through Fire", "Love is Sacrifice", "Sins of Billions", "We Are One", "Forgiven" and "Watching Over Me." He also co-wrote songs for other Christian artists including Margaret Becker, Steve Camp, Rick Cua, Kenny Marks, Geoff Moore, Petra, Ricky Skaggs and Dick Tunney.

As a songwriter, Frazier has been nominated for a Grammy Award and two Dove Awards. He has had songs placed in feature films, network TV shows and shows on the Netlix and Starz platforms.

Solo discography
Cut It Away (1984)
This Town (1986)
Heartland (1990)
Retrospect (1992)
The Long Run (1993)
The Things I Say (1997)
Rob Frazier's Blues Farmers - Jammin' The Blues (1999)

References

1953 births
Place of birth missing (living people)
Living people
Petra (band) members
American rock singers
American rock guitarists
American male guitarists
American performers of Christian music
Guitarists from Philadelphia
Record producers from Pennsylvania
Songwriters from Pennsylvania
20th-century American guitarists
20th-century American male musicians
American male songwriters